Jake Strachan (born 25 December 1996 in Australia) is an Australian rugby union player who plays for the  in Global Rapid Rugby and the Super Rugby AU competition. His original playing position is fly-half or fullback. He was named in the Force squad for the Global Rapid Rugby competition in 2020.

Reference list

External links
Rugby.com.au profile
itsrugby.co.uk profile

1996 births
Australian rugby union players
Living people
Rugby union fly-halves
Rugby union fullbacks
Brisbane City (rugby union) players
Western Force players
Rugby union players from Brisbane